W Network (often shortened to W) is a Canadian English language discretionary specialty channel owned by Corus Entertainment. The channel primarily broadcasts general entertainment programming oriented towards a female audience.

W Network was established in 1995 as the Women's Television Network (WTN), which had a focus on women's lifestyle programming. The channel was eventually acquired by Corus in 2001 and relaunched under its current branding in 2002. As part of the relaunch, W's programming shifted to a mix of both entertainment and lifestyle programming. By 2017, W had moved its lifestyle programming to its sister networks, focusing exclusively on entertainment programming.

The channel is available in two time shifted feeds, East (operating from the Eastern Time Zone) and West (operating from the Pacific Time Zone).

History
In June 1994, Linda Rankin, on behalf of a corporation to be incorporated, (later incorporated as Lifestyle Television (1994) Limited, principally owned by Moffat Communications) was granted a television broadcasting licence by the Canadian Radio-television and Telecommunications Commission (CRTC) to operate a channel called Lifestyle Television, described as offering "information and entertainment programming of particular interest to women."

The channel subsequently launched on January 1, 1995 as Women's Television Network (WTN). Like Moffat's other cable television operations, WTN was headquartered in Winnipeg, Manitoba. Linda Rankin served as the president of the network from its launch.

Programming on the network was originally largely focused on lifestyle programming that many had suggested was "feminist" in nature. Such programming included female takes on traditionally male-dominated activities such as fishing and mechanics, with Natural Angler and Car Care, respectively. While other programs, such as Go Girl!, took a comedic approach at parodying typical female-targeted talk shows that discussed subjects such as beauty, fashion, etc. Other programs included films, current affairs, and occasionally sports.

The channel suffered from low ratings in the beginning. Of the slew of new channels launched on January 1, WTN was initially the lowest rated channel on average. Linda Rankin later resigned in August 1995 citing "differences in management philosophy".
 
In December 2000, Shaw Communications announced it intended to purchase Moffat. The deal was later closed in early 2001. Shaw announced in March 2001 that it would sell WTN to Corus Entertainment, a company that it spun off in 1999, for $205 million CAD (Shaw had primarily acquired Moffat for its cable television systems). Once Corus took ownership of the channel, it moved operations from Winnipeg to Toronto in mid-January 2002, laying off 50 employees in the process. Subsequently, Corus relaunched the network as W on April 15, 2002 with a more entertainment-oriented mix of recent dramas and movies. On the same date, Corus launched the west coast feed.

In 2009, Corus Entertainment acquired SexTV: The Channel from CTVglobemedia, and relaunched the channel as W Movies — a spin-off of W Network focusing on films aimed towards women, on March 1, 2010. On December 12, 2016, W Movies renamed and relaunched as a Canadian version of the Cooking Channel.

On August 2, 2011, the channel launched its HD feed, a simulcast of W Network's standard-definition Eastern-time feed. The HD feed was added to Bell Satellite TV satellite and Bell Fibe TV channel lineups on March 23, 2012. It was also available on Eastlink, Optik TV, Shaw Direct, SaskTel, Rogers Cable, Cogeco, and Access Communications. On October 1, 2013, an HD feed for the Western-time channel was launched on Shaw Cable, then on Shaw Direct on September 18, 2019.

Since the 2017–18 season, W Network has re-oriented its programming towards scripted television series and movies. The majority of its lifestyle programming, including the Property Brothers franchise, was moved to HGTV Canada, as well as Corus' other women and lifestyle networks.

On October 25, 2018, Corus announced a content deal with Crown Media Holdings, giving W Network exclusive Canadian rights to original movies and series produced for Hallmark Channel and Hallmark Movies & Mysteries. W Network will broadcast branded blocks of Hallmark Channel content, including local versions of Hallmark Channel's seasonal programming events. The partnership officially launched on November 1, 2018 with the Countdown to Christmas event.

Syndicated Programming
A Million Little Things
Chesapeke Shores
Days of our Lives
Days of our Lives: A Very Salem Christmas
Days of our Lives: Beyond Salem
Fraiser
Five Bedrooms
The Girl from Plainville
Girls5eva
The Good Fight
Good Witch
I Am…
Katy Keene
Law and Order: Speical Victims Unit
Mom
NCIS: Los Angeles 
One of Us is Lying
Outlander
Pitch Perfect: Bumper in Berlin
Sex with Sue
The Way Home
The Best Man: The Final Chapters
This Way Up
Vampire Academy
Walker: Independence
Will and Grace

Upcoming Syndicated Programming

Original Programming
W Network primarily broadcasts a mix of television dramas and films, including programming acquired from Hallmark Channel, most of which is filmed in Canada. W previously produced and aired unscripted reality shows and lifestyle programming; it was well known for originating the Love It or List It and Property Brothers franchises seen on HGTV in the United States. These programs ultimately moved to HGTV Canada and Corus' other lifestyle networks following W's shift to scripted programming acquisitions.

Original series

References

External links
 
 W Network media

Analog cable television networks in Canada
Corus Entertainment networks
1995 establishments in Canada
Television channels and stations established in 1995
Women's interest channels
English-language television stations in Canada